Steven Jacobs may refer to:

 Steven Jacobs (television presenter) (born 1967), Australian television presenter
 Steven Jacobs (cricketer) (born 1988), Guyanese cricketer
 Steven Jacobs (footballer) (born 1987), Belgian footballer
 Steve Jacobs (footballer) (born 1961), English footballer
 Steven L. Jacobs (born 1947), American historian

See also
 Steve Jacobs (born 1967), Australian actor